"Hedgehog's Dilemma", also known by the Japanese title  is the fourth episode of the anime Neon Genesis Evangelion, which was created by Gainax. The episode, written by Akio Satsukawa and directed by Tsuyoshi Kaga, was first broadcast on TV Tokyo on October 25, 1995. The series is set fifteen years after a worldwide cataclysm named Second Impact, and is mostly set in the futuristic, fortified city Tokyo-3. The episode's protagonist is Shinji Ikari, a teenage boy who is recruited by his father Gendo to the organization Nerv to pilot a giant bio-machine mecha named Evangelion into combat with beings called Angels. In the episode, Shinji is overcome by the stress of being an Evangelion pilot and runs away from home. After wandering around Tokyo-3, he must choose between quitting and staying at Nerv.

Production of "Hedgehog's Dilemma" took place after the fifth and sixth episodes were made, and the content varied from the staff's original ideas. It is the only episode in which Neon Genesis Evangelion director Hideaki Anno is not credited with direction or screenplay. The episode's title references the namesake concept proposed by German philosopher Arthur Schopenhauer, variously called the "hedgehog's" or the "porcupine's dilemma". The episode scored a 5.8% rating of audience share on Japanese TV and was generally well-received by critics. The episode received appreciation for focusing on the psychological description of the characters. Critics also appreciated the philosophical themes and directorial choices of "Hedgehog's Dilemma", such as the representation of natural landscapes and the use of still images.

Plot
Special agency Nerv Major Misato Katsuragi notices Shinji Ikari, a minor in her custody and official Evangelion pilot, has run away from home. Shinji aimlessly wanders around the city of Tokyo-3 and the countryside, and meets his classmate Kensuke Aida sleeping in a tent. In the morning, men in black escort Shinji back to Nerv headquarters, where he renounces the title of pilot and chooses to return to ordinary life. Shinji is taken to a station to board a special government train, and meets Kensuke and Toji Suzuhara, another Shinji's classmate who had struck him in the previous episode. Toji reconciles with Shinji under Kensuke's push. Misato drives to the station, believing Shinji has already left. She notices Shinji, who has decided not to board the train, on the platform, and they smile at each other.

Production

"Hedgehog's Dilemma" was once omitted in terms of the series composition, and it was planned that the fifth episode "Rei I" would come after the third, "A Transfer". After the battle against Angel Shamshel, Shinji would become friends with Toji Suzuhara and Kensuke Aida in "A Transfer", receiving a call from them. As production progressed, however, staff members said they thought there was a need to depict Shinji's relationships with the people around him after the third episode. "Hedgehog's Dilemma" was thus made with contents that differ from the original plans. Moreover, Neon Genesis Evangelion director Hideaki Anno had already worked on the fifth and sixth episodes of the series, and tried to go beyond regular anime and develop realistic characters with the installments.

The episode's script was written after the fifth episode's script had already been finalized, making "Hedgehog's Dilemma" the only episode in which director Anno did not have direct input into the plot and script. Akio Satsukawa wrote the episode, while Junichi Sato, who is credited as Kiichi Jinme, drew the storyboard. Tsuyoshi Kaga directed the episode and Satoshi Shigeta served as chief animator. In 1993, a presentation volume of Neon Genesis Evangelion named  was published. In the original project, the fourth episode should have been titled ; during the episode, Shinji's birthday would occur, but his father Gendo would have ignored the son without wishing him a happy birthday. Rei Ayanami would then attempt to make dinner for both of them, while Misato would decide something for Shinji.

During production, the staff thought about opening and closing the episode with Misato reading the day's notes from her diary, but the idea was dropped and used for the movie Neon Genesis Evangelion: Death and Rebirth (1997). The draft script for "Hedgehog's Dilemma" also mentions dates that were cut from the broadcast, according to which the fourth episode spanned 15 to 18 July 2015. Furthermore, in a scene in which Shinji watches the disaster film about the Second Impact in a cinema, a "story within a story" script was created and dubbed for realism, including all of the film's main characters, who were voiced by Kōichi Nagano, Hiro Yūki, Megumi Hayashibara, Fumihiko Tachiki as the doctor, Tetsuya Iwanaga and Tomokazu Seki as his assistants. A frame in which Rei is analyzed in a computerized scanning was added in the following scenes, in which normal cells have been integrated with computer-generated effects. The Tokyo-3 signs in the night scene were also produced by the staff on the computer, and were later incorporated into the final drawings.

During the episode, existing geographical places such as Atsugi, Gōra, the Ōwakudani valley, and Lake Ashi, are named and drawn. A fictional JRG train model named Odakyu 7700 series CHiSE was also drawn for the episode. Hayashibara and Hiro Yūki served as female and male speakers of the train, respectively. Hayashibara and Yūko Miyamura also voiced two prostitutes in a scene in which Shinji wanders Tokyo-3 at night. For the last scene, which is set in the New Hakone Yumoto station, staff took inspiration from the real Hakone-Yumoto Station. The stairs into which Shinji is led by the men in black were depicted as dark, similar to the corridors of a prison. Another Okadyu Romancecar train similar to the Odakyu 10000 series HiSE was drawn for the scene, along with a Renault Alpine A310 car without modifications driven by Misato. In the same sequence, the songs Bay Side Love Story – from Tokyo and Face from Masami Okui's album Gyuu (1995) were used as background music. A fifty-second-long take in which Shinji and Misato look at each other in the station was added as a conclusion to the episode. The take was originally supposed to be one minute long, but staff decided to cut it during production. British singer Claire Littley also sang a cover of "Fly Me to the Moon" which was later used as the episode's closing theme song, replaced in late home video editions by another cover by Yoko Takahashi.

Cultural references and themes

The episode's English title "Hedgehog's Dilemma" references the psychoanalytic concept of the porcupine's dilemma, mentioned for the first time in the previous episode and usually used to describe the behaviors of individuals with a borderline personality disorder. Like the porcupines of Arthur Schopenhauer's Parerga and Paralipomena, Shinji is afraid to be hurt and withdraws from human contact. His relationship with Misato Katsuragi follows Schopenhauer's concept, since they both hurt but look for each other. Misato is also a victim of the dilemma, and during the episode she realizes Shinji's loneliness and communication difficulties. Gualtiero Cannarsi, who cured the Italian adaptation of the series, noticed the characters get closer without hurting each other at the end of the episode.

Schopenhauer originally named his concept after the porcupine, or Hystricidae (Stachelschweine in German); Evangelion staff however chose an alternative translation, since they wanted to portray Shinji as a hedgehog, an animal with smaller, blunter spines than those of a porcupine, suggesting more delicacy for the character. Furthermore, according to director Anno, when Shinji says "I'm back" at the New Hakone Yumoto station, the first stage of his growth journey ends.

Shinji's temporary resignation from Nerv is a tribute to the television series The Prisoner, while writer Dani Cavallaro noticed that "Van Gogh-style sunflowers" appear in the scene in which Shinji wanders through campaign fields. Junichi Sato compared the third and the fourth episode of Evangelion to Mobile Suit Victory Gundam, while critic Mario Pasqualini likened the scene in which Shinji stops near a Jizō statue to a similar sequence in the film My Neighbor Totoro (1988). Cannarsi also noticed Kensuke plays a survivor game alone in "Hedgehog's Dilemma", comparing him to a military fan who appears in Otaku no Video (1991), a previous work by Gainax. Multiversity Comics' Matthew Garcia traced an influence on the episodes "A Transfer" and "Hedgehog's Dilemma" to Hideaki Anno's personal experience, particularly the production of his previous work, Nadia; according to him, like Anno on Nadia, Shinji is thrown "into a situation he didn't understand or have much investment in".

The main theme of "A Transfer" and "Hedgehog's Dilemma" is interpersonal communication. No battle against an Angel is presented in the episode, which is entirely focused on the psychology of the characters instead. Cannarsi and Yūichirō Oguro, the editor of supplemental materials included in the Japanese edition of the series, noticed Evangelion characters have communication difficulties, except for Kensuke, who shows great communication skills in the episode. Kensuke takes advantage of his dialectical skills with his classmates Toji and Shinji in "Hedgehog's Dilemma", but they described his communicative ability as a defense mechanism that could mask loneliness and inner fragility. Walter Veit in Psychology Today compared Shinji's behavior to Jean-Paul Sartre's existentialist concept of bad faith and Albert Camus's "philosophical suicide" for his passivity and his submissive attitude. During the episode, Shinji flees from reality and listens to music with his Sony Digital Audio Tape, constantly repeating tracks 25 and 26; Carl Gustav Horn, editor of the English edition of the Evangelion manga, linked the tracks to the last two episodes of Evangelion, which close the series in an interrogative style. Moreover, Joshua Sorensen of Film Daze compared Shinji's attitude in "Hedgehog's Dilemma" to otakus, a Japanese term for young people who are obsessed with computers or particular aspects of pop culture to the detriment of their social skills. The series' assistant director Kazuya Tsurumaki, noting "distant, awkward communication" can be observed between Shinji and other characters in the first episodes, described Evangelion as a "story about communication" that is directed to the otakus, criticized by director Anno for being overly closed in on themselves.

Reception
"Hedgehog's Dilemma" aired on October 25, 1995, and scored a 5.8% rating of audience share on Japanese TV. The episode was generally well received by critics. Stephen Bijan, writing for The Verge, described "Hedgehog's Dilemma"'s plot as one of the great tensions of the series and Shinji's reactions as instructive; he also considered the episode as an example of the show capacity of "synthesizing its philosophical influences into a coherent, cohesive whole". Anime News Network's reviewer Nick Creamer described it as "harrowing" and a "wholly tonal, visually driven experience".

EX.org's Peter Cahill praised "A Transfer" and "Hedgehog's Dilemma", but also stated "action fans might be a little disappointed in the story", since character psychology has a more prominent role in it than mecha fights. Max Covill of Film School Rejects ranked "Hedgehog's Dilemma" among the lowest  of Neon Genesis Evangelion episodes; he criticized Shinji for being "whiny and unlikable", attributing the negative traits to the exclusion of Anno from the screenplay, but he also listed the scene of the colloquy between Shinji and Misato, with the Nerv logo in the background, among the "perfect shots" of the series. Anthony Gramuglia from Comic Book Resources defended Shinji's refusal to pilot the Eva and his weakness, comparing him to Amuro Ray from Mobile Suit Gundam, which he said was viewed "more favorably" by anime fans.

The Animé Café Japanese reviewer Akio Nagatomi described the scene in which Kensuke plays a survivor game alone as an example of the "incongruous character traits" presented in the episode. He also said that the viewer is never concerned about the plot development, since "It's just not that well written". Jane Nagatomi similarly described the ending as "predictable enough", but praised the scene in which Shinji, Toji and Kensuke talk as "really cute", "definitely a touch different". For writer and anime critic Dani Cavallaro, Shinji's train ride in "Hedgehog's Dilemma" supplies a "paradigmatic example" of the series' directorial style, and said the silence surrounding Shinji as he attempts to flee his responsibilities "evokes with admirable conciseness his pathological separation from his fellow humans". Cavallaro also praised the exchange between Shinji and Misato after he escapes from home as "emotionally intense". Writer Dennis Redmond described the natural scenery around Tokyo-3 shown in the episode as "gorgeous". Forbes Lauren Orsini praised the final scene's still frame of Shinji and Misato, describing it as a "refreshing alternative" from the frenetic action of modern shows and "a silent response to the noise that allows us to look inward alongside these characters". The episode's philosophical component was generally appreciated by critics.

Psychology Today Walter Veit attributed the popularization of the concept of the porcupine dilemma to Evangelion. Official merchandise based on the episode has also been released, including lighters, umbrellas, and t-shirts.

References

Citations

Bibliography

External links
 

1995 Japanese television episodes
Neon Genesis Evangelion episodes
Science fiction television episodes